Cerithiella macroura is a species of very small sea snail, a marine gastropod mollusk in the family Newtoniellidae. It was described by Melvill and Standen, in 1912.

Description 
The maximum recorded shell length is 3.55 mm.

Habitat 
Minimum recorded depth is 102 m. Maximum recorded depth is 102 m.

References

Newtoniellidae
Gastropods described in 1912